Oliver Hilmes (born 1971 in Viersen, Germany) is a German author who has written several historical biographies. His study of Cosima Wagner, the daughter of the 19th century composer Franz Liszt and his biography of Alma Mahler a Viennese-born socialite, have been translated into English.

Education 
Oliver Hilmes studied history, political science and psychology at Marburg University, the Sorbonne in Paris and the University of Potsdam. He earned his doctorate with a dissertation on the history of the 20th century and has worked since 2002 for the Berlin Philharmonic Orchestra. He has been active as personal adviser to the general manager on such projects as the introduction of the Berlin Philharmonic's Education Program and the conversion of the orchestra into a foundation.

Work

Oliver Hilmes achieved prominence through his biographies of Alma Mahler-Werfel, Cosima Wagner, Franz Liszt and Bavarian King Ludwig II.

Tilman Krause, the literary critic of the German daily newspaper “Die Welt” described him in 2007 as the “Wunderkind among the German biographers”.

Oliver Hilmes is on the board (from 1996–2013 as executive director) of the Karg-Elert Society, which promotes the study of the artistic and academic works of composer and music theoretician Sigfrid Karg-Elert.

In 2016 he discovered the residency card of Richard Friedländer, a German Jew, in Berlin's residence archives, which affirms that Magda Goebbels was his biological daughter.

Awards 
 2008: Geisteswissenschaften International – Preis zur Förderung der Übersetzung geisteswissenschaftlicher Literatur for: Herrin des Hügels. Das Leben der Cosima Wagner (Siedler)
 2013: Prix des Muses (prix spécial du jury) for: Cosima Wagner. La maîtresse de la colline (Perrin)
 2018: William Hill Sports Book of the Year (Shortlist) for: Berlin 1936. Sixteen Days in August  (The Bodley Head)
 2019: The Sporting Club General Outstanding Book of the Year 2019 for: Berlin 1936. Sixteen Days in August  (The Bodley Head)

Publications 
 Berlin 1936. Sechzehn Tage im August. Siedler, Munich 2016, 
 Malevolent Muse: The Life of Alma Mahler. Northeastern University Press, 2015, .
 Cosima Wagner: The Lady of Bayreuth. Yale University Press, 2010, .
 Ludwig II.: Der unzeitgemäße König. Siedler, Munich 2013, .
 Liszt: Biographie eines Superstars. Siedler, Munich 2011, .
 Cosimas Kinder: Triumph und Tragödie der Wagner-Dynastie. Siedler, Munich 2009, .
 Im Fadenkreuz. Politische Gustav Mahler-Rezeption 1919–1945. Eine Studie über den Zusammenhang von Antisemitismus und Kritik an der Moderne. Peter Lang, Frankfurt am Main 2003, .
 Der Streit ums „Deutsche“. Alfred Heuß und die Zeitschrift für Musik. Von Bockel, Hamburg 2003, .
 Mit Gustav Mahler in Viersen. In: Elke Heidenreich (Ed.), Ein Traum von Musik, 46 Liebeserklärungen. Edition Elke Heidenreich bei C. Bertelsmann, Munich 2010, .

External links 
 Authors Website

References

German biographers
Male biographers
1971 births
Living people
Liszt scholars